The 1997 Leekes British Open Squash Championships was held at the Welsh Institute of Sport with the later stages being held at the Wales National Ice Rink in Cardiff from 31 March- 6 April 1997. The event was won by Michelle Martin for the fifth consecutive year defeating Sarah Fitzgerald in a repeat of the 1996 final.

Seeds

Draw and results

Qualifying round

Lucky Loser* due to the withdrawal of Cassie Jackman.

First round

Second round

Quarter-finals

Semi-finals

Final

References

Women's British Open Squash Championships
Squash in Wales
Sports competitions in Cardiff
Women's British Open Squash Championship
1990s in Cardiff
Women's British Open Squash Championship
1997 in women's squash
Squ